Rakshasa is a 2005 Indian Kannada language crime thriller film directed by Sadhu Kokila, written by Ranganath and produced by Ramu. The film features Shiva Rajkumar and Gajala in the lead roles along with Ruthika, Amrutha and Kishore in other pivotal roles.

The film featured original score and soundtrack composed by Sadhu Kokila. Upon release, the film was appreciated for its making style and won numerous awards at the Karnataka State Film Awards for the year 2004–05.  The movie was dubbed in Hindi as Kaliya No. 1.

Cast 

 Shiva Rajkumar as  ACP Harish Chandra/Rakshasa
 Gajala 
 Ruthika as Shabbir's wife
 Amrutha 
 Kishore as Shabbir
 Rangayana Raghu as SI Cheluvaraju
 Avinash
 H. G. Dattatreya as Doreswamy, Indian Freedom Fighter 
 Ramesh Bhat
 Kote Prabhakar as Selva
 Mohan Juneja
 Master Aniruddh
 Pavitra Lokesh
 Vijay
 Kaddipudi Chandru 
 Sai Sunil 
 Kuri Sagar 
 Mimicry Dayanand 
 Killer Venkatesh 
 Sridhar Raj 
 Bank Suresh 
 Jolly Bastin 
 Muni
 Kourava Venkatesh 
 Mass Madha 
 Kung-fu Chandru 
 Shankar Narayan 
 Vijayasarathi 
 Myna Chandru 
 H. M. T. Nandha 
 Kari Subbu 
 Suryodaya Parampalli 
 NGEF Rama murthy 
 Shailaja Joshi 
 Badri Narayan 
 K. V. Manjayya 
 Guru Murthy 
 Guru Das
 Ramesh Pandith 
 G. K. Govinda Rao 
 Dinesh Mangalore 
 Ganesh Rao Kesarkar 
 Prithviraj
 Tushar Ranganath
 Shankar Rao

Soundtrack 

The music was composed by Sadhu Kokila and the audio was sold on Jhankar Music label. The soundtrack album consists of seven tracks.

Awards
 2004–05 Karnataka State Film Awards :
 Best Supporting Actor - Kishore
 Best Music director - Sadhu Kokila
 Best Art Director - Dinesh Mangalore
 Best Child actor - Aniruddh

References

External links 
 Movie review

2005 films
2000s Kannada-language films
Indian action films
Films about organised crime in India
2000s masala films
Fictional portrayals of the Karnataka Police
Films directed by Sadhu Kokila
2005 action films

kn:ರಾಕ್ಷಸ